Telmo Além da Silva (born 13 January 1975), known simply as Telmo, is a Brazilian retired footballer who played as a left back.

Club career
Born in Volta Redonda, Rio de Janeiro, Telmo arrived in Portugal in January 1998, joining S.C. Campomaiorense in the country's Primeira Liga and remaining in the territory for the following decade uninterrupted, safe for a loan return in Brazil with Sport Club do Recife.

He represented, also, C.D. Santa Clara, S.C. Braga and Varzim SC. With the latter team, he appeared in seven consecutive second division seasons, being relegated in 2011 (13 matches, one goal from the player); he continued to play with the same club until June 2015, when he announced his retirement aged already 40.

Honours
Santa Clara
Segunda Liga: 2000–01

References

External links

1975 births
Living people
People from Volta Redonda
Brazilian footballers
Association football defenders
Volta Redonda FC players
Madureira Esporte Clube players
Central Sport Club players
Sport Club do Recife players
Primeira Liga players
Liga Portugal 2 players
Segunda Divisão players
S.C. Campomaiorense players
C.D. Santa Clara players
S.C. Braga players
Varzim S.C. players
Brazilian expatriate footballers
Expatriate footballers in Portugal
Brazilian expatriate sportspeople in Portugal
Sportspeople from Rio de Janeiro (state)